Sluice Art Fair (also known as Sluice  or stylized as Sluice__) is a London-based biennial contemporary art fair open to alternative galleries and art organisations run by artists and curators.

History
Sluice Art Fair was founded by artist Karl England and art historian Ben Street in 2011 with the first iteration of the fair taking place in Mayfair at the same week as the Frieze Art Fair. Galleries included Transition Gallery, Fordham and Studio1.1. In 2013 the art fair moved to Bermondsey opposite White Cube and expanded to incorporate galleries from Cardiff, Manchester, Birmingham, Liverpool, Bristol, Southampton, Athens, Barcelona, and Brooklyn, New York. The third iteration of the London-based fair, Sluice__2015, will take place in London's Oxo Tower.

In 2014 Sluice collaborated with collaboration Centotto & Theodore:Art on the Exchange Rates international expo in Brooklyn, New York.

References

External links 
Sluice__ official website

Festivals in London
Art festivals in the United Kingdom
Art fairs
Arts festivals in England